Edmund Scambler (c. 1520 – 7 May 1594) was an English bishop.

Life

He was born at Gressingham, and was educated at Peterhouse, Cambridge, Queens' College, Cambridge and Jesus College, Cambridge, graduating B.A. in 1542.

Under Mary I of England he was pastor to a covert Protestant congregation in London. He was a chaplain to Archbishop Matthew Parker.

He became Bishop of Peterborough in 1561, and was a reviser of the Bishops' Bible. He suspended Eusebius Pagit, then vicar of Lamport, in 1574.

In 1585 he became Bishop of Norwich. He was responsible there for the heresy proceedings against Francis Kett.

Notes

1520 births
1594 deaths
Bishops of Norwich
Bishops of Peterborough
Alumni of Peterhouse, Cambridge
Alumni of Queens' College, Cambridge
Alumni of Jesus College, Cambridge
People from the City of Lancaster
16th-century Church of England bishops